Research on Armenian Architecture (RAA) is a non-governmental organisation NGO (Foundation since 2010) established in Aachen, Germany, in 1982 by Dr. Armen Hakhnazarian. Long before its official creation, RAA interests and activities have been carried out since the late 1960s. In 1996, RAA USA was founded, followed by RAA Armenia in 1998. Until 2020, Samvel Karapetian  was the director of the RAA-Armenia.
Jora Manucharian is currently the chairman of the board of trustees of the foundation, and RAA-Armenia is governed by a board of directors: Emma Abrahamian (Samvel's wife), managing director; Raffi Kortoshian, co-director administrative and publications; Ashot Hakobyan, co-director architectural activities; Armen Gevorgyan, co-director computers and technology

Activities 
Research on Armenian Architecture (RAA) investigates, and documents Armenian monuments located outside the borders of present-day Armenia, namely in Historical Armenia (the Armenian districts of Turkey, Iran, Georgia and Azerbaijan). RAA also carries out studies concerning Diaspora Armenian settlements in Syria, Turkey, Lebanon, India, Russia, etc. During its research activities, RAA has acquired a rich database of 650,000 articles, ranging from digital images and measurements, to plans, maps and archive materials, becoming the basis of numerous scientific works intended not only for Armenians but also for the international community.

References

External links 
 RAA Official Website
 RAA Monuments Database Website

 Historical monuments of Artsakh website <ref>[https://www.golosarmenii.am/article/167970/pamyatniki-arcaxa-na-odnoj-platforme </ref>

 RAA Films
 RAA Facebook Page

Architecture in Armenia